Shah Faisal Colony, founded as Drigh Colony (Drigh Village Refugee Colony) is a residential and commercial area in Karachi, Sindh province of Pakistan.

History 
It is founded in 1952.

It is located in Shah Faisal town of Korangi district.

The area is named after the late King Faisal of Saudi Arabia. Drigh Colony was the previous name of this area.

It is the house of Drigh Colony railway station.

References

Neighbourhoods of Karachi
Shah Faisal Town